The 2020 Giro dell'Emilia was the 103rd edition of the Giro dell'Emilia road cycling one-day race. It was held on 18 August 2020 as part of the 2020 UCI Europe Tour and the inaugural UCI ProSeries.

Teams
Twenty-five teams, consisting of eight UCI WorldTeams, eight UCI ProTeams, eight UCI Continental teams, and one national team, participated in the race.

UCI WorldTeams

 
 
 
 
 
 
 
 

UCI Professional Continental Teams

 
 
 
 
 
 
 
 

UCI Continental Teams

 
 
 
 
 
 
 
 

National Teams

 Italy

Results

References

External links

Giro dell'Emilia
Giro dell'Emilia
Giro dell'Emilia
Giro dell'Emilia
2020 UCI ProSeries